Paulo Victor Mileo Vidotti (born 12 January 1987), known as Paulo Victor Vidotti or simply Paulo Victor, is a Brazilian professional footballer who plays as a goalkeeper for Saudi Arabian club Al-Ettifaq.

Career

Flamengo
The young Paulo Victor started his career in the city of Assis, the career of Paulo Victor began in school football Peraltinha, at the time directed by the coach Roberto Carlos Amoriélli, the “Mé”. In the professional, in 2004 Paulo Victor defended the colors of Assisense championship Campeonato Paulista da Segunda Divisão that year the team just did not rise to Campeonato Paulista Série A3 by two goals, he arrived at Flamengo in 2004, with 17 years old. Since then he won many titles with club's the youth team, such as youth Campeonato Carioca de Juniores, three times (2005, 2006 and 2007), Torneio Octávio Pinto Guimarães twice (2006, 2007) and Copa Record Rio de Futebol (2005), marking the debut for the club professional, even if only on the bench.

Promoted from the youth team in the beginning of 2007 by the coach Ney Franco. In 2008 Paulo had his first chance at professional level playing, on loan, 13 matches for America-RJ in the Campeonato Carioca.

Paulo Victor became the team's second choice as goalkeeper after Bruno and Diego left the club in 2010.

In the last match of the 2010 Campeonato Brasileiro Série A Paulo Victor had his first chance in the club's professional team in a match against Santos at Vila Belmiro, the match ended 0x0.

He became the club's first string goalkeeper after Marcelo Lomba transferred from Flamengo in 2011.

Gaziantepspor (loan)
On January 26, 2017 Gaziantepspor signed Paulo Victor on loan until the end of the 2017-18 season. He debuted at the Turkish league three days later against Trabzonspor in a 4-0 loss. Despite having a long loan contract with the Turkish club, Paulo Victor re-signed with Gaziantepspor due to wage arrears.

Grêmio
From 2017 to 2021, Paulo Victor played for Brazilian club Grêmio, featuring in a total of 108 games for the side and winning the 2017 Copa Libertadores and the 2018 Recopa Sudamericana. On August 3, 2021, Paulo Victor terminated his contract with the club making him a free agent.

Marítimo
On August 6, 2021 Portuguese club Marítimo signed Paulo Victor on a free transfer, with a one year contract agreed.

Al-Ettifaq
On 8 July 2022, Paulo Victor joined Saudi Arabian club Al-Ettifaq on a one-year deal with an option to extend for a further year.

Career statistics

Honours
Flamengo
Campeonato Brasileiro Série A: 2009
Copa do Brasil: 2013
Campeonato Carioca: 2007, 2008, 2009, 2011, 2014

Grêmio
Copa Libertadores: 2017
Recopa Sudamericana: 2018
Campeonato Gaúcho: 2018, 2019, 2020, 2021
Recopa Gaúcha: 2019, 2021

References

External links

Brazilian footballers
Living people
1987 births
CR Flamengo footballers
America Football Club (RJ) players
Gaziantepspor footballers
Grêmio Foot-Ball Porto Alegrense players
C.S. Marítimo players
Ettifaq FC players
Campeonato Brasileiro Série A players
Saudi Professional League players
Association football goalkeepers
Brazilian expatriate footballers
Expatriate footballers in Portugal
Expatriate footballers in Saudi Arabia
Brazilian expatriate sportspeople in Portugal
Brazilian expatriate sportspeople in Saudi Arabia
People from Assis